Dofinivka Estuary, Great Adzhalyk Estuary, or Dofinivskyi Lyman, is a brackish water area in South Ukraine, in 12 km to east from Odessa. The water body is an estuary of small steppe river Great Adzhalyk, which inflows to the estuary in northern part. The length of the estuary is about 8 km, width about 1 km. The water body is very shallow, maximal depth is 1.2 m, but average less than 0.5 m.

It is separated from the Black Sea by the sandbar. It is artificially connected with the sea by a tube, about 1 m in diameter, since July 2001. The estuary is the shallowest water body in the north-western Black Sea.

References
 Starushenko L.I., Bushuyev S.G. (2001) Prichernomorskiye limany Odeschiny i ih rybohoziaystvennoye znacheniye. Astroprint, Odessa, 151 pp. (in Russian)
 North-western Black Sea: biology and ecology, Eds.: Y.P. Zaitsev, B.G. Aleksandrov, G.G. Minicheva, Naukova Dumka, Kiev, 2006, 701 pp.

Look also
 Berezan Estuary
 Tylihul Estuary
 Khadzhibey Estuary
 Dniester Estuary
 Sukhyi Estuary

Estuaries of the Black Sea
Estuaries of Ukraine
Landforms of Odesa Oblast